Bein mont is a Burmese pancake, widely available as a street food. It is a traditional Burmese snack, part of a broader family of dishes known as mont. The pancake batter is rice flour based. After cooking the pancakes are immersed in jaggery syrup with coconut shavings and garnished with sesame seeds, peanuts and poppy seeds, hence the name.

References

Burmese cuisine
Pancakes
Pastries with poppy seeds
Burmese desserts and snacks
Rice cakes